Seven in the Sun is a 1960 Italian adventure film written and directed  by Sergio Bergonzelli and starring Frank Latimore and Gianna Maria Canale.

Plot

Cast

 Frank Latimore as Frank
 Gianna Maria Canale as Libertà
 Saro Urzì as  Fernand
 John Kitzmiller as  Salvador
 Marisa Belli as Jana
 Marco Guglielmi
 Eduardo Passarelli

References

External links

1960 adventure films
Italian adventure films
Films directed by Sergio Bergonzelli
1960 directorial debut films
1960 films
Films set in South America
Films with screenplays by Sergio Bergonzelli
1960s Italian-language films
1960s Italian films